Yitzchok (Yitzchak) Lichtenstein (Hebrew: יצחק אבא ליכטנשטיין; born December 1962) is an Israeli-American Orthodox rabbi who is a co-rosh yeshiva of Yeshiva Torah Vodaas located in Brooklyn, New York and the Mara d'asra of Kehillas Bais Avrohom in Monsey. He is a major editor for the writings of Chaim Soloveitchik, Moshe Soloveichik and Joseph B. Soloveitchik. He is the second son of Rav Aharon Lichtenstein and Dr. Tovah Soloveitchik.

Biography 
Yitzchok Lichtenstein went on Aliyah with his family in 1971 from New York, when his father Aharon Lichtenstein was offered the position of Rosh Yeshiva at Yeshivat Har Etzion. He studied at the Netiv Meir High School in Jerusalem. He received Semicha at Yeshiva University in 1983, where he studied under his grandfather, Joseph B. Soloveitchik. He also studied in the Lakewood Yeshiva and the Brisk Yeshiva in Jerusalem, where he was a Talmid of Meshulam Dovid Soloveitchik, his grandfather's first-cousin.

Lichtenstein was appointed the Rosh Yeshiva of Yeshivat Nesivos HaTorah in Staten Island and Mara D'asra of the Beit Avraham congregation in Monsey. He taught at the Orchos Chaim yeshiva in Monsey, the "Agra D’Pirka" yeshiva, the Bialystoker shul, and various other venues.

After the passing away of the previous Roshei Yeshiva, Avrohom Pam and Yisroel Belsky, Yeshiva Torah Vodaas began a search for a new Rosh Yeshiva. In October 2018, Lichtenstein was appointed Rosh Yeshiva of Yeshiva Torah Vodaas.

Lichtenstein is a publisher of the writings of his ancestors Chaim Soloveitchik, Moshe Soloveichik and Joseph Ber Soloveitchik.

Personal life 
Lichtenstein is married to Rochel Grozovsky, the granddaughter of Reuven Grozovsky, former Rosh Yeshiva of Yeshiva Torah Vodaas and son-in-law of Baruch Bar-Leibowitz.

Published works 
 Shiurei Rabbeinu Chaim HaLevi: Bava Kama, Bava Matzia, Bava Batra - Notes on his Shiurim from the Volozhin Yeshiva; together with his relative, Moshe Halevi Meiselman
 Kitvei Rabbeinu Chaim HaLevi: Shas and Rambam
 Haggadah Shel Pesach: Si'ach HaGri"d
 Chiddushei HaGra"m VeHaGri"d
 Chiddushei HaGra"m VeHaGri"d – Inyanei Kodshim
 Chiddushei HaGra"m HaLevi: Chiddushim U'Beurim Lefi Seder HaRambam

Family tree

References 

Living people
1962 births
21st-century American rabbis
Haredi rabbis
Rosh yeshivas
American Orthodox rabbis
Soloveitchik rabbinic dynasty